Hassan Hirt is a French long-distance runner. At the 2012 Summer Olympics, he competed in the Men's 5000 metres, finishing 26th overall in Round 1, failing to qualify for the final. He was later disqualified for testing positive for EPO and suspended for 2 years.

References

Living people
People from Saint-Dizier
French male long-distance runners
Olympic athletes of France
Athletes (track and field) at the 2012 Summer Olympics
Doping cases in athletics
Sportspeople from Haute-Marne
Year of birth missing (living people)
21st-century French people